JGC Holdings Corporation, formerly , and before that , is a global engineering company headquartered in Yokohama, Japan.

The company was founded on 25 October 1928.  In 1976, it changed its original name from Japan Gasoline Co. to JGC Corp. In 2019, it changed its name to JGC Holdings Corporation to reflect its changed corporate structure.  JGC participates in the design and construction of large energy projects, such as Al Zour Refinery, Nigeria LNG, Pearl GTL, Ichthys LNG, Gorgon LNG, Tangguh LNG and Dolphin Gas Project and over the course of the company's history it implemented over  projects in 50 countries.

The company is listed on the first section of Tokyo Stock Exchange and is a constituent of the TOPIX 100 and Nikkei 225 stock market indices.

References

External links

  

 
Engineering companies of Japan
Energy engineering and contractor companies
Companies listed on the Tokyo Stock Exchange
Companies based in Yokohama
Construction and civil engineering companies established in 1928
Japanese companies established in 1928